Alev Erisir is a Turkish-American neuroscientist. She is a Professor of Psychology and the Department Chair at the University of Virginia in Charlottesville. Her primary research areas include synaptic connectivity in the visual and taste systems, neuronal circuit plasticity, and ultrastructural neuroanatomy.

Early life and education 
Erisir was born in Kastamonu, Turkey. Her father was stationed in Kastamonu as a malaria eradication doctor. As an infant, Erisir moved with her family to Canakkale, Turkey, where she grew up until the age of 11. The family then moved to Istanbul, Turkey, where Erisir completed her secondary education. In 1986, following high school graduation, Erisir attended Istanbul University School of Medicine and received her MD. In 1996, Erisir graduated from the State University of New York at Stony Brook with a PhD in Behavioral Neuroscience.

Research and career 
Erisir completed postdoctoral training at New York University (NYU) Center for Neural Science. She completed her training under the guidance of Chiye Aoki. In Aoki's laboratory, Professor Erisir trained specifically in Electron Microscopy. After completing her training at NYU, Erisir completed a one-year postdoctoral appointment at New York Medical College (NYMC)  in the department of Physiology. Following her time at NYMC, Erisir returned to NYU this time as a Research Assistant Professor.

In 2000, Erisir started working at University of Virginia (UVA) as an assistant professor. In 2013, she was granted professor status at UVA. During her time at UVA, Erisir has served in several administrative roles, including co-director of the neuroscience graduate program, director of the cognitive science program, and director of the neuroscience undergraduate program. In 2016, she was appointed to be the chair of the psychology department at UVA.

At UVA, Erisir's research has consisted of investigating ocular dominance column plasticity using several different techniques, brain stem gustatory circuitry, the aging brain and its pathology, and three-dimensional connectomics.

Erisir conducts studies on cellular mechanisms within the aging brain and neurodegenerative diseases such as Alzheimer's disease. Her work examines the relationship between hyperactive oligodendrocytes and cognitive impairments in Alzheimer's mouse models. Additionally, Erisir's research examines proteins such as beta-amyloid and tau that result in the loss of synaptic plasticity.

In 2008, Erisir received a University of Virginia Mead Grant, which funded an opportunity for Erisir to take undergraduates to the annual Society of Neuroscience conference. In 2010, she mentored a research project that investigated rodent neural circuitry between the brainstem and the oral cavity. This project was selected by the University of Virginia to receive the "Double Hoo" Grant.

Selected publications

References 

Year of birth missing (living people)
Living people
People from Kastamonu
Istanbul University Faculty of Medicine alumni
Turkish women physicians
Turkish physicians
Stony Brook University alumni
American women psychologists
University of Virginia School of Medicine faculty
American women neuroscientists
American academics of Turkish descent
21st-century American women